François G. Richard (February 2, 1873 – March 29, 1967) was a Canadian politician. He served in the Legislative Assembly of New Brunswick as the Liberal party member for Kent County from 1925 to 1939. His son André would also later serve in the legislature for the same riding from 1857 to 1974.

References

1873 births
1967 deaths
20th-century Canadian politicians
New Brunswick Liberal Association MLAs